Danilo Terenzi (2 March 1956 – 4 May 1995) was an Italian jazz trombonist and composer born in Rome, Italy, perhaps best known for his big band work with Giorgio Gaslini. Terenzi had also recorded with several other artists, including Mike Westbrook and Chris Biscoe.

From 1969 to 1975 Terenzi studied the trombone at the Santa Cecilia Conservatory in Rome. He had also worked with many well-known names in jazz music, including Archie Shepp, Roswell Rudd, Enrico Rava, Paul Rutherford, Albert Mangelsdorff, Mel Lewis and Steve Lacy. On the Mike Westbrook album "The Orchestra Of Smith's Academy" (Enja; 1998), the Steve Martland band performed a Westbrook tribute to Danilo titled "Blues For Terenzi".

Select discography

Laboratorio Della Quercia (Horo)
With Riccardo Fassi
Out Of Phase (Phrases)
Mike Westbrook
On Duke's Birthday (hat Art)

Italian jazz trombonists
1956 births
1995 deaths
20th-century Italian musicians
Italian jazz musicians
20th-century trombonists